Shadows of Love is the seventh studio album by the American pop singer Nicolette Larson. It was released in 1988 in Italy only through CGD Records. The album was produced by Carlo Stretti and Ernesto Tabarelli.

Background
With Shadows of Love, Larson returned to pop following her cross over into country music with the release of ...Say When (1985) and Rose of My Heart (1986). Shadows of Love was recorded in Italy during 1987 at Studio Watermelon in Milan. It was released as Larson's final mainstream album in 1988, and the album would also become her second to last studio album following her death in 1997, after the 1994 album Sleep, Baby, Sleep - a collection of children's lullabies. The album was not a commercial success and soon afterwards Larson began pursuing an acting career.

The album features eight tracks with Larson co-writing two. The song "Love Hurts", originally released by The Everly Brothers in 1960, was written by Felice and Boudleaux Bryant. The title track is a cover of the 1986 song by the duo Wax, and was written by its band members Andrew Gold and Graham Gouldman. American singer-songwriter Lauren Wood contributed two songs to the album, "Work on It" and "Where Did I Get These Tears". The latter track was originally found on Wood's self-titled 1979 debut album, while "Work on It" was included on her 1981 album Cat Trick. Larson had previously recorded another song of Wood's, "Fallen", for the album In the Nick of Time.

The album's sole single was "Let Me Be the One" which was written by Larson and Mauro Paoluzzi. It was issued on both 7" and 12" vinyl by CGD in Europe. Co-produced by Paoluzzi, the single featured "Where Did I Get These Tears" as the B-side. The 7" vinyl single featured an edit of the "Let Me Be the One", cutting the song by approximately one minute, while the 12" vinyl version used the full-length album version. The single, like the album, was not a commercial success, and proved to be Larson's last single release. During 1988, Larson contributed to the soundtracks of the films Renegade and Twins. For Renegade, "Let Me Be the One" was used, and featured on the soundtrack release, which was issued by WEA in Germany that year.

Release
Shadows of Love was issued on vinyl and cassette only in Italy and is now out of print. During the year of the album's release, CGD (Compagnia Generale del Disco) went out of business. Warner Music Group acquired the label to form CGD East West and continued CGD's operations. In 2013, Pro Music issued a limited run of promotional slipcase CD copies of the album.

Track listing

Personnel
 Nicolette Larson - vocals
 Andrea Braido - guitar
 Mimmo Bianchi - keyboards, bass, drums
 Riccardo Luppi - saxophone
 Gwen Aanti, Daniela Rando, Betty Vittori, Massimo Crestini - backing vocals
 Carlo Stretti, Ernesto Tabarelli - producers

References

1988 albums
Nicolette Larson albums
Compagnia Generale del Disco albums